Stephen William Marsh (born 12 September 1924) is a former Australian rules footballer who represented  and  in the West Australian National Football League (WANFL) during the 1940s and 1950s.

Marsh is regarded as one of the finest rovers of his era. Quick off the mark, elusive, courageous, a leader and highly skilled by hand or foot – he was famed for his drop kicks to position.

Early life and career
Born in Kalgoorlie, Western Australia, Marsh first played with the Kalgoorlie Railways Football Club, kicking four goals in their 1943 premiership win.  He was on leave from the Air Force at the time.  He then arrived in Fremantle before the 1945 WANFL season and upon arriving at Fremantle Oval, he was invited into the South Fremantle Football Club rooms first, so chose to play for them, rather than East Fremantle who also trained at the same oval.  The commonly recited myth that he accidentally entered the wrong rooms is incorrect.

Here he played 226 games over 12 seasons, which included being a player in six premiership teams (1947, 1948, 1950, 1952, 1953 and 1954) from nine grand final appearances. South Fremantle made the finals in all the twelve years he played with the club. He won the Simpson Medal as best on ground in the club's 1953 grand final win. He was the winner of the 1952 Sandover Medal as the league's best and fairest and won the South Fremantle Fairest and Best award four times (1950, 1951, 1952, 1956).  He was also a member of the inaugural All-Australian Team in 1953 after the Adelaide carnival.

Somewhat controversially he moved to East Fremantle Football Club in 1957 as Captain/Coach for two years on the then unheard of fee of £300. He was captain/coach of East Fremantle's 1957 premiership win. He played 39 games for East Fremantle and in 1960, having amassed a career total of 284 games, he retired as a player.

Marsh played 19 games for Western Australia, and was captain of the side in 1954.

Marsh was known as an inspirational player whose courage in a contest would often motivate his teammates.  His impact as a player and motivator was reinforced emphatically in 1957 with the new captain-coach leading the East Fremantle Sharks to their first flag in 11 years on his way to receiving a premiership pay 'bonus', while his former club South Fremantle missed the finals for the first time since the end of World War II.

His vocal playing characteristic however may have cost him some personal glory.  During his career Marsh only won a single Sandover Medal, but fellow Hall of Fame member John Todd opined that Marsh's fondness for backchatting umpires probably cost him a couple of medals.  Marsh himself is on record as stating that he did not lead the South Fremantle Bulldogs during their golden era because "I had too big a mouth to be captain".

Marsh was made an inaugural member of the Fremantle Football Club created Fremantle Football Hall of Legends in 1995. In 2005 he was elevated to Legend Status in the West Australian Football Hall of Fame.  He is also a member of the Western Australian Institute of Sport Hall of Champions.

The Steve Marsh Entrance to Subiaco Oval is named in his honour.

In June 2006 he was inducted into the Australian Football Hall of Fame in the player category.

References

Bibliography

External links

 

1924 births
Living people
South Fremantle Football Club players
East Fremantle Football Club players
Australian Football Hall of Fame inductees
All-Australians (1953–1988)
Sandover Medal winners
East Fremantle Football Club coaches
Australian rules footballers from Western Australia
West Australian Football Hall of Fame inductees
Kalgoorlie Railways Football Club players
People from Kalgoorlie
Royal Australian Air Force personnel of World War II
Military personnel from Western Australia